Brindister may refer to the following places on Mainland, Shetland, Scotland:

Brindister, South Mainland
Brindister, West Mainland